Alexandre Hébert (4 March 1921, Alvimare, Seine-Maritime  - 16 January 2010), was a French  activist, anarchist and trade unionist. He had a pivotal role in the accession of anarchists to the French trade-unions congress Workers' Force (CGT-FO). He became secretary of the departmental union  of Loire Atlantique, from its inception, as well as Raymond Patoux, secretary of the departmental union  of Maine et Loire, as shown by the research Libertaires et syndicalistes révolutionnaires dans la Confédération Générale du Travail - Force Ouvrière (1946-1957) by Guillaume Trousset, andL'Union Départementale CGT-Force ouvrière de Maine et Loire de 1948 à 195 by Manuella Noyer. He played an important role in the accession to these unions of militants of the autonomous Fédération de l'Education Nationale in 1982, 1983 and 1984. Its activities of militant trade unionism had been permanently in the style set out by Fernand Pelloutier in the letter to his anarchist friends Lettre aux anarchistes in 1899. He didn't cease to fight against all the followers (official and unofficial) of trade unionism who were subservient to political parties, Christian trade unionism, autonomous trade unionism, partisan trade unionism, and all varieties of company sponsored or integrated trade unionism; he could never get along with the followers of all these sorts of trade unionism! A fighter for workers' emancipation in all circumstances, he did not hesitate to separate himself from some of his anarchist fellows who took another way, including that of joining the varieties of Christian trade unionism. As a militant anarchist, he was of those who reconstructed the anarchist movement after the second world war, through the Fédération anarchiste; in 1954, he was one of those who reconstructed the Fédération anarchist destroyed by the Leninist action of Georges Fontenis; in 1961, he contributed with his followers of the Groupe Fernand Pelloutier to the publication of the news bulletin L'Anarcho-syndicaliste, prelude to the constitution of the Union des anarcho-syndicalistes. Not having any sectarianism, he tried at all times to gather together the activist workers anxious to preserve the independence of trade unions; a friend of  Pierre Boussel alias Pierre Lambert, he certainly helped the abandonment by the members of his Trotskyist party of the Marxist–Leninist-Trotskyist idea of the need to link the unions to the “revolutionary party”. Free-thinker, secular activist, and rationalist, he took part in the initiative of the l'Appel aux laïque against the policy concerning the public schools and the institutions of the Republic followed by the President of the Republic François Mitterrand.

References

External links 
 meltl.com
 anti.mythes.voila.net
 anti.mythes.voila.net
 www.pelloutier.net
 www.pelloutier.net

1921 births
2010 deaths
People from Seine-Maritime
Workers and Peasants' Socialist Party politicians
French anarchists
Members of the General Confederation of Labour (France)
Workers' Force members